San Giovanni dei Fieri is an ancient church in Pisa, Italy, located on Via Pietro Gori on the left bank of the Arno.

In the 12th century it was known as San Giovannino.  In 1614, the church was renovated by the architect Cosimo Pugliani. The church belonged to the Order of St John of Jerusalem, which also owned the church of Santo Sepolcro. The church currently belongs to the Seventh-day Adventist Church. The white marble façade recalls the churches of San Matteo and San Francesco in  the same city.

Sources

Roman Catholic churches in Pisa
Buildings and structures in Pisa
Roman Catholic churches completed in 1614
Baroque architecture in Pisa
17th-century Roman Catholic church buildings in Italy
Former Roman Catholic church buildings
Seventh-day Adventist churches